Muricopsis zeteki is a species of sea snail, a marine gastropod mollusk in the family Muricidae, the murex snails or rock snails.

Description

Distribution

References

External links
  Wood, W. (1828). Supplement to the Index Testaceologicus; or A catalogue of Shells, British and Foreign. Richard Taylor, London. Iv [+1 + 59 pp., plates 1-8,]
 Hertlein L.G. & Strong A.M. (1951). Eastern Pacific expeditions of the New York Zoological Society. XLIII. Mollusks from the west coast of Mexico and Central America. Part X. Zoologica. 36(2): 67-120, 11 pls

Muricopsis
Gastropods described in 1951